Cape Prescott is a headland in the Qikiqtaaluk Region, Canada. 

The cape was named by the 1875–1876 British Arctic Expedition led by Captain George Nares. There is an abundance of walruses in the area.

Geography
Cape Prescott is located in the eastern coast of Ellesmere Island, southwest of the Allman Bay and of the Darling Peninsula in the Nares Strait area. Norman Lockyer Island lies  WSW of Cape Prescott.

References

External links 

Full text of "Journals and proceedings of the Arctic Expedition, 1875-6, under the command of Captain Sir George S. Nares, R.N., K.C.B"

Headlands of Qikiqtaaluk Region
Ellesmere Island